Port City Java is a specialty coffee roaster and coffeehouse franchisor based in Wilmington, North Carolina. Founded in 1995, it has over 25 cafes in the United States.  The company was named #31 in Entrepreneur Magazines Top 50 New Franchises. Port City Java serves specialty coffee beverages in addition to smoothies, shakes, teas, breakfast all day, and a selection of lunch sandwiches.

See also

 List of coffeehouse chains

References

External links
 Official Website
 Business Intelligence Middle East article on Dubai deal

Coffeehouses and cafés in the United States
Companies based in Wilmington, North Carolina
American companies established in 1995
Food and drink companies established in 1995
Retail companies established in 1995
Restaurants established in 1995
Privately held companies based in North Carolina
1995 establishments in North Carolina